The Puget Sound John Brown Gun Club (PSJBGC) is a Puget Sound Area gun club, formerly affiliated with Redneck Revolt. During the George Floyd protests in June 2020, the group attended the Capitol Hill Autonomous Zone in Seattle. 

The club calls itself an "anti-fascist, anti-racist, pro-worker community defense organization". The Guardian has called it an "anti-fascist armed leftist group" that "provide[s] security against rightwing aggression".

Willem van Spronsen, a former member of the club,  attacked the Immigration and Customs Enforcement (ICE) detention center in Tacoma with incendiary devices in July 2019 while armed with an AR-15 rifle. He was killed by Tacoma Police Department officers in the attack.

The club has counter-protested Patriot Prayer marches in Seattle.

Notes

References

Further reading 
 
 

Anti-fascist organizations in the United States
Gun rights advocacy groups in the United States
Left-wing militant groups in the United States
2017 establishments in Washington (state)
Organizations established in 2017